Stéphanie Durocher (born May 24, 1989) was a Canadian synchronized swimmer and Olympian.

Career
Durocher became a member of Canada's national team in 2008. She competed in the women's team event at the 2012 Olympic Games, finishing fourth. She won gold medal at the 2011 Pan American Games, and a bronze at the 2011 World Aquatics Championships as part of team Canada.

Honours
In 2012 Durocher was awarded a Queen Elizabeth II Diamond Jubilee Medal.

References

External links 
 

1989 births
Living people
Canadian synchronized swimmers
French Quebecers
Olympic synchronized swimmers of Canada
People from Repentigny, Quebec
Sportspeople from Quebec
Synchronized swimmers at the 2012 Summer Olympics
World Aquatics Championships medalists in synchronised swimming
Synchronized swimmers at the 2011 World Aquatics Championships
Pan American Games gold medalists for Canada
Pan American Games medalists in synchronized swimming
Synchronized swimmers at the 2011 Pan American Games
Medalists at the 2011 Pan American Games